Dysschema practides is a moth of the family Erebidae first described by Herbert Druce in 1911. It is found in Colombia.

References

Moths described in 1911
Dysschema